Hamid al-Din Abu'l-Hasan Ahmad ibn Abdallah al-Kirmani (CE) was an Isma'ili scholar. He was of Persian origin and was probably born in the province of Kirman. He seems to have spent the greater part of his life as a Fatimid da'i (missionary) in Baghdad and Basra. He was a theologian and philosopher who rose to prominence during the Fatimid caliph-imam al-Hakim bi Amr Allah (r. 996–1021).

A prominent Ismaili da'i or missionary, he was considered by the central headquarters of the Fatimid da'wa in Cairo as one of the most learned Ismaili theologians and philosophers of the Fatimid period. It was in that capacity that al-Kirmani played an important role in refuting the extremist ideas of some of the dissident da'is, who by proclaiming al-Hakim's divinity had initiated the Druze movement. Al-Kirmani was summoned in 1014 or shortly earlier to Cairo where he produced several works to disclaim these extremist doctrines.  Al-Kirmani's writings, which were widely circulated, were to some extent successful in checking the spread of the extremist doctrines.

Works
Of his corpus of nearly thirty works, only eighteen seem to have survived. His major philosophical treatise, the Rahat al-aql (Peace of Mind), was finished in 1020.  In this work, Al-Kirmani intended to provide the reader an opportunity to understand how to obtain the eternal life of the mind, the paradise of reason, in a constantly changing world.

Some of his prominent works are:
 Rahat al-‘aql (Peace of Mind, or Comfort of Reason), completed in 1020 and considered his magnum opus
 Al-Aqwal al-dhahabiya, refuting al-Razi's argument against the necessity of revelation
 Kitab al-riyad, a book that propounds the early Isma'ili cosmology.
Kitab al- masabih, an Islamic treatise on the necessity of Iamamate.

References

Sources

Further reading

External links
 Hamid al-Din al-Kirmani at the Internet Encyclopedia of Philosophy

11th-century Muslim scholars of Islam
11th-century Iranian philosophers
Ismaili da'is
11th-century Persian-language writers
People from Kerman Province
11th-century people from the Fatimid Caliphate
Scholars from the Fatimid Caliphate
Iranian theologians
10th-century Ismailis
11th-century Ismailis
10th-century Persian-language writers
10th-century Iranian philosophers